Acosmium is a South America genus of flowering plants in the family Fabaceae. Three species are currently recognized. Most Acosmium species have been recently transferred to Leptolobium and one species to the South American Guianodendron while the genus Acosmium itself has been transferred from the tribe Sophoreae to the tribe Dalbergieae in a monophyletic clade informally known as the Pterocarpus clade.

References

External links
  Grupo de Pesquisas Sistemática e Morfologia de Angiospermas de Roraima - Universidade Federal de Roraima, Boa Vista, Roraima, Brazil.

Dalbergieae
Fabaceae genera